Karacakılavuz  is a town in the central district (Tekirdağ) of Tekirdağ Province, Turkey. The population of Karacakılavuz is 3204  as of 2011. According to a popular legend the settlement was named after a roe deer which acted as a guide to the pursuing hunters and directed them to the location of the settlement. However, former name of the settlement during the Ottoman Empire was Karacakuloğuz (Dark servant Oğuz) which diminishes the plausibility of the legend. The oldest tombstones in the graveyard of the settlement are dated 1730. In 1884-1885, Turks from Sevlievo (whom had recently fallen under Bulgaria) were settled in the settlement. In 1971 the settlement was declared a seat of township. The town economy depends on agriculture. The main crops produced are wheat, sun flower, canola and fodder.

References

Populated places in Tekirdağ Province
Towns in Turkey